Dalgain, also known as the McCabe House, is a historic home located at Charleston, West Virginia. Robert E, McCabe, for whom the house was built in 1916, was a prominent Charleston attorney active in the city's business life. It is an American Foursquare-style house that features a white stucco exterior and green roof.

It was listed on the National Register of Historic Places in 1984 as part of the South Hills Multiple Resource Area.

References

American Foursquare architecture in West Virginia
Houses in Charleston, West Virginia
H. Rus Warne buildings
Houses completed in 1916
Houses on the National Register of Historic Places in West Virginia
National Register of Historic Places in Charleston, West Virginia